Halgerda diaphana is a species of sea slug, a dorid nudibranch, shell-less marine gastropod mollusks in the family Discodorididae.

Distribution
This species was originally described from numerous specimens collected in Okinawa Island, Japan. It has subsequently been found several times at the nearby Kerama Islands.
Also been found in Dauin, Negros, Philippines.

References

Discodorididae
Gastropods described in 1999